The Ecstasy of St Margaret of Cortona is an oil on canvas painting by the Italian Baroque painter Giovanni Lanfranco, executed in 1622. It is housed in the Palatine Gallery of the Pitti Palace in Florence, Italy.

Description
The painting depicts a mystical event occurring to the 13th-century Franciscan tertiary, Margaret of Cortona. In the painting, she swoons while upheld by two angels, and has a vision of a Christ aloft on a cloud, showing her his stigmata. Margaret narrated that in the vision, Christ called her my beloved daughter. Margaret's waist is girded with the rope cincture that characterizes members of the Franciscan orders. The small dog at her feet is a common feature of her iconography; it recalls the story that her dog found the body of her murdered lover, this event her life triggered her movement towards an eremitic life.  The bare background is dark but rises to a luminous gilded light surround the figure of Christ. The baroque arrangement by Lanfranco, places the figures along a diagonal in the canvas and grants a realistic solidity to the characters, focusing the attention on Margaret's psychic state and not only her overpowering miraculous vision. The veneration of Saint Margaret of Cortona was prominent in Tuscany.

The painting was commissioned in 1622 by Nicolo Gerolamo Venuti, whose coat of arms is at the lower left, and decorated at the main altar for the church of Santa Maria Nuova in Cortona. It was purchased for the palace by Prince Ferdinand de' Medici, who provided to the church a replacement canvas on the same subject by Giuseppe Maria Crespi. This painting is now in the Diocesan Museum of Cortona.

Lanfranco in his design appears to show the influence of Caravaggio's oil painting depicting St Francis in Ecstasy (1596). In turn, this painting may have influenced the design of the statuary group (1645-1662) depicting the Ecstasy of St Theresa by Gian Lorenzo Bernini.

References

1622 paintings
Paintings by Giovanni Lanfranco
Paintings of saints